J. japonica  may refer to:
 Julia japonica, a sea snail species found in Wakayama, Honshū, Japan
 Justicia japonica, a flowering plant species

See also
 Japonica (disambiguation)